A by-election was held for the Australian House of Representatives seat of Echuca on 20 September 1919. This was triggered by the death of Nationalist MP Albert Palmer.

The by-election was won by William Hill, endorsed by the Victorian Farmers' Union, who became the second "Country" member of the Parliament following William Gibson's victory in the 1918 Corangamite by-election.

Results

References

1919 elections in Australia
Victorian federal by-elections
1910s in Victoria (Australia)